Selma Sabine Ergeç (born 1 November 1978) is a Turkish-German actress, beauty pageant titleholder, model, designer, philologist, psychologist and doctor. She is known for her performance in Asi, Vatanım Sensin, Yaşamayanlar and Muhteşem Yüzyıl as the sister of Sultan Süleyman; Hatice Sultan.

Early life and career
Born in Hamm, Germany. Her mother is German and her father is Turkish. She stated in an interview that her paternal family came from lineage of Mahmud II, Sultan of the Ottoman Empire. She studied medicine at Westfalia Wilhems University in Münster for 3 years and psychology and philosophy at the FernUniversität Hagen. She started modelling in 2000. She acted as Uğur Polat's wife in Sis ve Gece, as the teacher in Beş Vakit and as the Hatice Sultan in Muhteşem Yüzyıl.

Personal life
She speaks German, English, Turkish, French fluently and Italian with limited proficiency.

On 26 September 2015 Ergeç married Can Öz. The wedding was held in Ergeç's childhood hometown in Germany. The couple's daughter, Yasmin, was born on 8 April 2016.

Filmography

Film

Television

Digital (internet)

Advertising

Music Video
Gidecek Yerim Mi Var - Emre Altuğ

References

External links

Official website

1978 births
Living people
People from Hamm
German film actresses
Turkish film actresses
German female models
Turkish female models
German people of Turkish descent
Turkish people of German descent
German television actresses
Turkish television actresses
21st-century German actresses
21st-century Turkish actresses
University of Münster alumni